Nil is a unisex given name. Notable people with the name include:

 Nil Abarbanel (born 1987), Israeli footballer
 Nil Burak (born 1948), Turkish Cypriot pop singer and actress
 August Emil Fieldorf ("Nil"; 1895–1953), Polish brigadier general
 Nil Filatov (1847–1902), Russian pediatric
 Nil Hilevich (1931–2016), Belarusian poet
 Nil Izvorov (1823–1905), Bulgarian priest
 Nil Karaibrahimgil (born 1976), Turkish female singer and songwriter
 Nil Khasevych (1905–1952), Ukrainian artist and political figure
 Nil Köksal, Turkish-born Canadian television journalist
 Nil Lushchak (born 1973), Ukrainian bishop
 Nil Maizar (born 1970), Indonesian football team manager
 Nil Mısır (born 1987), Turkish female para archer
 Nil Montserrat (born 1988), Spanish racing driver
 Nil de Oliveira (born 1986), Brazilian-Swedish athlete a
 Nil Ruiz (born 2003), Spanish football player
 Nil Solans (born 1992), Spanish rally driver
 Nil Yalter (born 1938), Turkish artist

Turkish feminine given names
Unisex given names